The Indian Astronomical Observatory (IAO) is a high-altitude astronomy station located in Hanle, India and operated by the Indian Institute of Astrophysics. Situated in the Western Himalayas at an elevation of 4,500 meters (14,764 ft), the IAO is one of the world's highest located sites for optical, infrared and gamma-ray telescopes. It is currently the tenth (see List of highest astronomical observatories) highest optical telescope in the world. It is India's first dark-sky preserve.

Location
The Indian Astronomical Observatory stands on Mt. Saraswati, Digpa-ratsa Ri, Hanle in south-eastern Ladakh union territory of India. Accessing the observatory, located near the Chinese border (Line of Actual Control), requires a 250 km long ten-hour drive from  Leh city, the headquarter of Leh district. Nyoma, 75 km northwest from Hanle, has an Indian military airbase.

History
In the late 1980s a committee chaired by Prof. B. V. Sreekantan recommended that a national large optical telescope be taken up as a priority project. The search for the site of the observatory was taken up in 1992 under the leadership of Prof. Arvind Bhatnagar. The scientists from the Indian Institute of Astrophysics found the site at Hanle.

The first light was seen by the Observatory 2-metre telescope on the midnight hour between 26 September and 27 September 2000.

The satellite link between the Centre for Research and Education in Science and Technology (CREST), Bangalore and Hanle was inaugurated by the then Jammu and Kashmir Chief Minister Dr. Farooq Abdullah on 2 June 2001. The Observatory was dedicated to the nation on 29 August 2001.

Observation: Dark-sky preserve 
In September 2022, it became India's first dark-sky preserve. The Hanle site is deemed to be excellent for visible, infrared and submillimeter observations throughout the year. Specifically the observation conditions yield about 255 spectroscopic nights per year, approximately 190 photometric nights per year and an annual rain plus snow precipitation of less than 10 cm. In addition, there are low ambient temperatures, low humidity, low concentration of atmospheric aerosols, low atmospheric water vapour, dark nights and low pollution.

Facilities
The Observatory has several active telescopes. The HCT is remotely operated from Bangalore from the Centre for Research and Education in Science and Technology (CREST) using a dedicated satellite link.

Himalayan Chandra Telescope (HCT)
The Himalayan Chandra Telescope is a 2.01 meters (6.5 feet) diameter optical-infrared telescope named after India-born Nobel laureate Subrahmanyam Chandrasekhar. It contains a modified Ritchey-Chretien system with a primary mirror made of ULE ceramic which is designed to withstand low temperatures it experiences. The telescope was manufactured by Electo-Optical System Technologies Inc. at Tucson, Arizona, USA. The telescope is mounted with 3 science instruments called Himalaya Faint Object Spectrograph (HFOSC), the near-IR imager and the optical CCD imager. The telescope is remotely operated via an INSAT-3B satellite link which allows operation even in sub-zero temperatures in winter.

GROWTH-India Telescope 
The GROWTH-India telescope is a 0.7 meter wide-field optical telescope that had first light in 2018. It is the country's first fully robotic research telescope. It was set up as a part of the international GROWTH program, and has been widely used for time domain astronomy. The telescope is operated jointly by IIT Bombay and the Indian Institute of Astrophysics.

IIA-Washington University Cassegrain telescope
Since 2011, the Indian Institute of Astrophysics (IIA) collaborates with the McDonnell Center for the Space Sciences of Washington University in St. Louis to operate two 0.5 meters Cassegrain telescopes to monitor active galactic nuclei. One of the observatories is established in Hanle. The facilities 180 degrees apart in longitude are together to be called the Antipodal Transient Observatory (ATO).

High Altitude Gamma Ray Telescope
The High Altitude Gamma Ray Telescope (HAGAR) is an atmospheric Cerenkov experiment with 7 telescopes setup in 2008. Each telescope has 7 mirrors with a total area of 4.4 square meters. The telescopes are deployed on the periphery of a circle of radius 50 meters with one telescope at the center. Each telescope has alt-azimuth mounting. A Himalayan Gamma Ray Observatory (HiGRO) was set up at Hanle in collaboration with Tata Institute of Fundamental Research, Mumbai and Bhabha Atomic Research Centre, Mumbai.

Major Atmospheric Cerenkov Experiment Telescope (MACE) was set up here in December 2012. The Experiment has a 21-meter collector which can collect gamma rays from space. The facility is a result of initiative led by Bhabha Atomic Research Centre in collaboration with Tata Institute of Fundamental Research, Indian Institute of Astrophysics, Bangalore and Saha Institute of Nuclear Physics Kolkata. The facility cost in 2011 was Rs. 400 million. As of 2011, it was the first and only such facility in the eastern hemisphere. The telescope was fabricated by the Electronics Corporation of India and was installed at the IAO in June 2014. This Telescope became the second largest gamma ray telescope in the world and the world's largest telescope at the highest altitude.

Center for Research and Education in Science and Technology
The Center for Research and Education in Science and Technology (CREST) is situated 35 km to the northeast of Bangalore near Hoskote town. The Center houses the control room for the remote operations of the 2m Himalayan Chandra Telescope (HCT) at the Indian Astronomical Observatory, Hanle, and the HCT data archive. The operations are controlled using a remote satellite link.

See also
 List of astronomical observatories
 Research
 Bharati (research station) 
 Dakshin Gangotri First Indian station 1983, converted to support base
 Maitri Second Indian station 1989
 Defence Research and Development Organisation 
 Defence Institute of High Altitude Research
 Indian Antarctic Program
 Jantar Mantar, Jaipur
 National Centre for Polar and Ocean Research
 Siachen Base Camp (India)
 List of Antarctic field camps
 List of Antarctic research stations
 List of highest astronomical observatories

 Borders
 Actual Ground Position Line (AGPL), India-Pakistan border across Siachen region
 Line of Actual Control (LAC), India-China border across Ladakh
 Line of Control (LoC), India-Pakistan border across Ladakh and Jammu and Kashmir

 Conflicts
 Sino-Indian War
 Indo-Pakistani wars and conflicts
 Siachen conflict
 Siachen Glacier

 Geography
 Geology of the Himalaya 
 Indus-Yarlung suture zone
 List of districts of Ladakh

 Tourism and infrastructure
 India-China Border Roads
 Siachen Base Camp (India) 
 Tourism in Ladakh

Pre-independence
Nizamia observatory

References

External links
 Official Website - Indian Astronomical Observatory
 2-m Himalayan Chandra Telescope with the 50-cm Antipodal Transient Observatory in the background
 Bangalore scientists, techies to help build largest telescopes

Astronomical observatories in India
Space programme of India
Indian Institute of Astrophysics
Buildings and structures in Ladakh
Leh district
Science and technology in Ladakh
2001 establishments in Jammu and Kashmir